Harry Christer Garpenborg  (born 12 May 1952) is a Swedish former sprinter who competed in the 1976 Summer Olympics.
1974 Chris Garpenborg tied the 60-yard world record at 5.9, beating Steve Williams in the Sunkist Invitational in Los Angeles.
1974 Chris Garpenborg won the Dallas Invitational 100 yard dash in 9.30, beating Don Quarrie. The handtimes showed 2 watches of 9.0, which would have equaled Ivory Crocket's world record.
1974 He won the Penn Relays 100 yard dash in the time of 9.2.
1976 Chris won the Las Vegas Invitational 100 meters in the time of 9.84, beating Clancy Edwards. The time was, however, disputed since the windguage was not functioning properly.
It is, however, the fastest time ever recorded by a Caucasian.
1976 AAU American champion 100 meters.
1976 Chris competed in the Montreal Olympics injured with a bad back.
1977 silver in 60 meters San Sebastian Spain European Championship beaten by Valeriy Borsov by 1 hundreds of a second. Many that witnessed the race
felt Chris was the victor including Borsov.
1977 European cup victories in the 100 and 200 meters.
In 1977 Chris had a serious motorcycle accident.
1980 New South Wales Champion 100 meters.
In 1980 preparing for the Moscow Olympics he was diagnosed with mercury poisoning believed to be caused by his amalgam fillings.
He came back from this ordeal to become Swedish Champion in the 100 meters once more before retiring from the sport.

References

Sources

Citations

1952 births
Living people
Swedish male sprinters
Olympic athletes of Sweden
Athletes (track and field) at the 1976 Summer Olympics
USA Outdoor Track and Field Championships winners
Athletes from Stockholm
20th-century Swedish people